DC Special was a comic book anthology series published by DC Comics originally from 1968 to 1971; it resumed publication from 1975 to 1977. For the most part, DC Special was a theme-based reprint title, mostly focusing on stories from DC's Golden Age; at the end of its run it published a few original stories.

Publication history
DC Special began publication with an issue focusing on the work of artist Carmine Infantino and cover dated October–December 1968. Some of the themes the title covered were special issues devoted to individual artists such as Infantino and Joe Kubert, strange sports stories, origins of super-villains, and stories of historical literary adventure characters such as Robin Hood and The Three Musketeers. Issue #4 featured many supernatural characters and writer Mark Hanerfeld and artist Bill Draut crafted the first appearance of Abel, who later became (along with his brother Cain) a major character in Neil Gaiman's The Sandman. The series was cancelled with issue #15 (November–December 1971).

The book was revived four years later and continued the numbering of the original series. The final three issues featured all-new stories. Issue #27 was a book-length Captain Comet and Tommy Tomorrow story by Bob Rozakis and Rich Buckler. Artist Don Newton began his career at DC Comics with an Aquaman story in DC Special #28 (July 1977). That same issue introduced the Quakemaster, an enemy of the Batman co-created by writer Bob Rozakis and artist John Calnan. Paul Levitz and Joe Staton finished the series with a Justice Society of America story which revealed the team's origin.

With DC Specials cancellation following issue #29 (Aug.–Sept. 1977), DC immediately begin publishing the umbrella one-shot title DC Special Series, which lasted until Fall 1981.

The issues

Collected editions
 Black Canary Archives includes the Black Canary story from DC Special #3, 224 pages, December 2000, 
 Secret Society of Super Villains Vol. 2 includes DC Special #27, 328 pages, May 2012, 
 Legion of Super-Heroes Archive Vol. 13 includes the Legion of Super-Heroes story from DC Special #28, 240 pages, May 2012, 
 Justice Society Vol. 1 includes DC Special #29, 224 pages, August 2006, 
 Showcase Presents: All-Star Comics''' Vol. 1 includes DC Special #29, 448 pages, September 2011, 

See also
 DC Special Series''

References

External links
 
 
 DC Special at Mike's Amazing World of Comics
 Daily Planet, volume 77, #2 (January 10, 1977) house advertisement for DC Special #27 at Mike's Amazing World of Comics

1968 comics debuts
1971 comics endings
1975 comics debuts
1977 comics endings
Comics anthologies
Comics by Gerry Conway
Comics by Paul Levitz
DC Comics titles
Defunct American comics
Superhero comics
Team-up comics